Hethersett was a railway station near Hethersett, Norfolk.

History

The Bill for the Norwich & Brandon Railway (N&BR) received Royal Assent on 10 May 1844. Work started on the line in 1844 and the line and its stations were opened on 30 July 1845. Hethersett station opened with the line and was situated east of Spink's Lane station and west of Trowse station. The line ran from Ely to Trowse, in Norwich. The link into Norwich was delayed due to the need to build a bridge over the River Wensum that kept the river navigable. One month before the N&BR opened a Bill authorising the amalgamation of the Yarmouth & Norwich Railway with the N&BR came into effect and so Hethersett station became a Norfolk Railway asset.

Spink's Lane was closed in November 1845, so the next station west of Hethersett was Wymondham.

The NR closed Hethersett station in September 1847.

Five years later and four years after the Eastern Counties Railway (ECR) took over the NR the new owners reopened Hethersett Station.

A decade after Hethersett reopened, the railways in East Anglia were in financial trouble, and most were leased to the ECR, which wished to amalgamate formally but could not obtain government agreement for this until an Act of Parliament on 7 August 1862, when the Great Eastern Railway (GER) was formed by the amalgamation. Hethersett became a GER station on 1 July 1862 when the GER took over the ECR.

The GER amalgamated with other railways to form the London & North Eastern Railway (LNER) on 1 January 1923, so Hethersett became a LNER station. On 1 January 1948 Hethersett became a BR station.

Hethersett Station was now served by Diesel trains from 1962. British Transport Commission (1954).

BR closed Hethersett station on 31 January 1966.

Hethersett was located some distance from the village it took its name from. It was located on the Great Eastern Railway Main Line between Norwich and Thetford. Despite its remote location, the station was served by between ten and twelve trains a day each way during the early 1960s. Following closure, the platforms were removed and the station building stood derelict for many years. It has now been restored and is an industrial premises.

References

External links
 Hethersett station on navigable 1946 O. S. map

Disused railway stations in Norfolk
Former Great Eastern Railway stations
Railway stations in Great Britain opened in 1845
Railway stations in Great Britain closed in 1966